Edwards Peninsula is an ice-covered peninsula about  long, between Murphy Inlet and Koether Inlet on the north side of Thurston Island. It was delineated from aerial photographs made by U.S. Navy Operation HIGHJUMP in December 1946 and by U.S. Navy Squadron VX-6 in January 1960, and was named by the Advisory Committee on Antarctic Names for Lieutenant Donald L. Edwards, the navigator of the USS Burton Island on the U.S. Navy Bellingshausen Sea Expedition to this area in February 1960.

Maps
 Thurston Island – Jones Mountains. 1:500000 Antarctica Sketch Map. US Geological Survey, 1967.
 Antarctic Digital Database (ADD). Scale 1:250000 topographic map of Antarctica. Scientific Committee on Antarctic Research (SCAR), 1993–2016.

References 

Peninsulas of Ellsworth Land
Thurston Island